Khin Aung Myint is a Burmese politician and incumbent Amyotha Hluttaw MP for Mandalay Region № 8 constituency. He previously served as Speaker of the Amyotha Hluttaw, the upper house of the Myanmar parliament. A senior official of the Myanmar military government and a major general, he was Director of Public Relations and Psychological Warfare in the Myanmar Ministry of Defense and was assigned as Minister of Culture after Kyi Aung in 2006. He is also a member of the Central Organizing Committee of the Myanmar War Veterans Organization.

Early life and education
Khin Aung Myint graduated from the 19th intake of the Defence Services Academy, in the same cohort as Min Aung Hlaing.

Career

During the 2007 Burmese protests he travelled to Shan State in the north of the country to lobby support for the continuity of the government regime. In a March 2012 interview with The Irrawaddy, he called corruption the biggest issue facing the country.

References

1945 births
Government ministers of Myanmar
Living people
Members of the House of Nationalities
Speakers of the House of Nationalities of Myanmar
Union Solidarity and Development Party politicians
Recipients of the Thiri Pyanchi